Iheya Island (Okinawan: 伊平屋島, Ihyaajima) is an island located in the Okinawa Islands of Okinawa Prefecture, Japan.

Its total population is 1,200, most of whom are ethnic Ryukyuans. To the southeast of Iheya is nearby Izena Island.

See also 

 Okinawa Islands
 Okinawa Prefecture

References 

Islands of Okinawa Prefecture
Ryukyu Islands